John Michael Cross (1 February 1859 – 12 April 1934) was a journalist and member of the Queensland Legislative Assembly.

Biography
Cross was born in Newcastle upon Tyne, England to parents Thomas Cross and his wife Elizabeth (née Burnett) and was educated in England. After his arrival in Australia he took up journalism and worked at several newspapers including the Brisbane Telegraph, the Northern Argus in Rockhampton, the Toowoomba Chronicle, the Maryborough Chronicle, and the Gympie Miner. He was also the editor of the Peoples' Newspaper in Rockhampton.

After his time in parliament he continued as a journalist and Hansard reporter in Brisbane. He was a councillor of the Royal Society of St George and a member of the Esoteric Lodge of Masonry.

On the 23 Aug 1884 he married Margaret Bell (died 1905) in Brisbane and together had two sons. He died in Brisbane in 1934 and was buried in the South Brisbane Cemetery.

Political career
At the 1893 Queensland colonial elections, Cross, for the Labour Party, defeated the sitting member, John Stevenson, for the seat of Clermont. He remained the member for six years, being defeated by Vincent Lesina in 1899.

References

Members of the Queensland Legislative Assembly
1859 births
1934 deaths
Burials in South Brisbane Cemetery